The 1901 Brown Bears football team was an American football team that represented Brown University as an independent during the 1901 college football season. W. P. Bates was the team captain.

The team played its home games at Andrews Field in Providence, Rhode Island.

Schedule

References

Brown
Brown Bears football seasons
Brown Bears football